TODA One I Love (International title: To the One I Love) is a 2019 Philippine television drama romantic comedy series broadcast on GMA Network. Directed by Jeffrey Hidalgo and Nick Olanka, it stars Ruru Madrid and Kylie Padilla. It premiered on February 4, 2019 on the network's Telebabad line up replacing Waves of Life. The series concluded on April 17, 2019 with a total of 53 episodes. It was replaced by Love You Two in its timeslot.

The series is streaming online on YouTube.

Premise
Set in San Bernabe, where two elections are underway; officers of the local Tricycle Owners and Drivers' Association and the new mayor. Involved in both elections is Gelay Dimagiba, who takes over her father's battles and his tricycle after he is murdered.

Cast and characters

Lead cast
 Kylie Padilla as Angela "Gelay" H. Dimagiba-Magsino
 Ruru Madrid as Raymond "Emong" Magsino

Supporting cast
 David Licauco as Kobe T. Generoso
 Gladys Reyes as Dyna Tuazon-Generoso
 Victor Neri as Miguel "Migs" Generoso
 Kim Domingo as Vicky
 Cai Cortez as Josefina "Finny" Rogers Obrero
 Jackie Rice as Tiffany "Tiffy" Obrero
 Maureen Larrazabal as Jane Magsino
 Tina Paner as Lea Hofilena-Dimagiba
 Raymond Bagatsing as Jessie Magsino
 Ayeesha Cervantes as Rachel H. Dimagiba
 Bruce Roeland as Anthony "Utoy" H. Dimagiba
 Buboy Villar as Bogart Cruz
 Kimpoy Feliciano as Dino Magsino
 Archie Alemania as Kevin

Guest cast
 Divine Aucina as Diyosa
 Arvic Tan as Tonny
 Joel Palencia as Tonyo
 Tommy Peñaflor as Troy
 Kevin Sagra as Jonas
 Gerhard Acao as Tintoy
 JJ Arao
 Scarlet James
 Baymax
 Katrina Halili as Georgina Ferreira / Gregoria "Oriang" Catacutan
 Christopher De Leon as Enrique Sixto
 Jaclyn Jose as Princess
 Denise Barbacena as young Dyna
 Lianne Valentin as young Georgina
 Ping Medina as Piping
 Sofia Pablo as young Gelay
 Dentrix Ponce as young Emong
 Allen Dizon as Joselito "Tolits" Dimagiba
 Odette Khan as Tasing
 Ashley Rivera
 Isabelle de Leon as Magnolia
 Boobay as Britney
 Phytos Ramirez as Nonoy
 Rodjun Cruz as Robert
 Christopher Roxas as Henry Alvarado
 Mathias Rhodes as Alvin

Episodes

February 2019

March 2019

April 2019

References

External links
 
 

2019 Philippine television series debuts
2019 Philippine television series endings
Filipino-language television shows
GMA Network drama series
GMA Integrated News and Public Affairs shows
Philippine political television series
Philippine romantic comedy television series
Television shows set in the Philippines